Naomi Benaron is an American author. With her novel Running the Rift she won the 2010 Bellwether Prize for fiction. This is awarded to a first novel which contributed to a literature of social engagement. Her collection of short stories Love Letter from a Fat Man, won the 2006 G.S. Sharat Chandra Prize for Fiction. Both the novel and the short story collection dealt with the Rwandan genocide. Ms Benaron has also published poetry and short stories in many journals and anthologies.

Born and raised in Boston, she lives in Tucson, and has worked at a variety of jobs while writing. She has a Master of Fine Arts degree from Antioch University in Los Angeles, and a Master of Science degree in Earth Sciences from Scripps Institute of Oceanography.

References

American women novelists
21st-century American novelists
Living people
Writers from Boston
Writers from Tucson, Arizona
Antioch University alumni
Scripps Institution of Oceanography alumni
21st-century American women writers
Novelists from Massachusetts
Novelists from Arizona
Year of birth missing (living people)